Sarab-e Seyah Push (also Romanized as Sarāb-e Seyāh Pūsh; also known as Sīāh Pūsh and Sīāhpūsh) is a village in Honam Rural District, in the Central District of Selseleh County, Lorestan Province, Iran. At the 2006 census, its population was 222, in 51 families.

References 

Towns and villages in Selseleh County